Carol O'Connell (born May 26, 1947, in New York) is an author of crime fiction, with a large series of crime books focusing around the character Kathy Mallory. The first book of twelve novels about Mallory is Mallory's Oracle, which was sent to England, where it was successfully auctioned in Europe. When it was brought back to the United States, it was widely sought-after.

O'Connell gained a Bachelor of Fine Arts in painting from Arizona State University but was unsuccessful as an artist and began writing novels as a hobby.

Bibliography
NYPD Det. Kathy Mallory
 Mallory's Oracle - May 1994
 The Man Who Cast Two Shadows - July 1, 1996; UK: The Man Who Lied to Women
 Killing Critics - UK: July 17, 1997
 Stone Angel - July 1, 1998; UK: Flight of the Stone Angel - December 19, 2006
 Shell Game - August 1, 2000
 Crime School - September 9, 2002 
 Dead Famous - September 7, 2004; UK: The Jury Must Die - August 19, 2004
 Winter House - September 6, 2005
 Find Me - October 2, 2007; UK: Shark Music - May 1, 2008 
 The Chalk Girl - July 3, 2012
 It Happens In The Dark - UK: August 20, 2013
 Blind Sight - September 20, 2016

Standalone
 The Judas Child - June, 1998
 Bone by Bone - November 3, 2009

References

1947 births
Living people
American women writers
Arizona State University alumni
Women mystery writers
21st-century American women